The 2021 Open Castilla y León was a professional tennis tournament played on outdoor hard courts. It was the 35th edition of the tournament and part of the 2021 ATP Challenger Tour. It took place in El Espinar, Segovia, Spain, between 26 July – 1 August 2021.

Singles main draw entrants

Seeds 

 1 Rankings as of 19 July 2021.

Other entrants 
The following players received wildcards into the singles main draw:
  Julio César Porras
  Alejandro Moro Cañas
  Nikolás Sánchez Izquierdo

The following players received entry into the singles main draw as alternates:
  Adrian Andreev
  Johannes Härteis
  Filip Jianu

The following players received entry from the qualifying draw:
  Carlos Gimeno Valero
  Nicolas Moreno de Alboran
  Dalibor Svrčina
  Luca Vanni

Champions

Singles

 Benjamin Bonzi def.  Tim van Rijthoven 7–6(12–10), 3–6, 6–4.

Doubles

 Robert Galloway /  Alex Lawson def.  JC Aragone /  Nicolás Barrientos 7–6(10–8), 6–4.

References

Open Castilla y León
2021 in Spanish tennis
July 2021 sports events in Spain
August 2021 sports events in Spain
2021
2021 Open Castilla y León